The 12th Congress of the Philippines (Filipino: Ikalabindalawang Kongreso ng Pilipinas), composed of the Philippine Senate and House of Representatives, met from July 23, 2001, until June 4, 2004, during the first three years of Gloria Macapagal Arroyo's presidency. The convening of the 12th Congress followed the 2001 general elections, which replaced half of the Senate membership, and the entire membership of the House of Representatives.

Sessions 
 First Regular Session: July 23, 2001 – June 7, 2002
 First Special Session: January 8 – March 1, 2002
 Second Regular Session: July 22, 2002 – June 6, 2003
 Third Regular Session: July 28, 2003 – June 4, 2004
 Second Special Session: January 5 – February 13, 2004

Legislation 
Laws passed by the 12th Congress:

Leadership

Senate 
 President of the Senate
Franklin M. Drilon (independent)
 Senate President Pro-Tempore
Manuel B. Villar Jr. (independent)
Juan M. Flavier (Lakas-NUCD)
 Majority Floor Leader
Loren B. Legarda (Lakas-CMD)
Aquilino Q. Pimentel Jr. (PDP–Laban)
Francis N. Pangilinan (Liberal)
 Minority Floor Leader
Aquilino Q. Pimentel Jr. (PDP–Laban)
Vicente C. Sotto III (LDP)

House of Representatives 
 Speaker of the House of Representatives
Jose C. de Venecia Jr. (Lakas-NUCD, 4th District Pangasinan)
 Deputy Speakers
 Luzon:   Emilio R. Espinosa (NPC, 2nd District Masbate)
 Visayas:   Raul V. del Mar (Lakas-NUCD/PROMDI, 1st District Cebu)
 Mindanao:   Abdulgani A. Salapuddin (Lakas-NUCD, Lone District Basilan)
 Central Luzon:   Benigno S. Aquino III (Liberal, 2nd District Tarlac)
 Majority Floor Leader
Florencio B. Abad (Liberal, Lone District Batanes)
 Minority Floor Leader
Carlos M. Padilla (LDP, Lone District Nueva Vizcaya)

Members

Composition

Senate 

Notes

House of Representatives 
The term of office of the members of the House of Representatives is from June 30, 2001, to June 30, 2004.

District representatives 

Notes

Party-list representatives

External links

Further reading 
 Philippine House of Representatives Congressional Library

See also 
 Congress of the Philippines
 Senate of the Philippines
 House of Representatives of the Philippines
 2001 Philippine general election

Congresses of the Philippines
Fifth Philippine Republic